Hirini Te Kani (?–1896) was a notable New Zealand tribal leader and soldier. Of Māori descent, he identified with the Ngati Porou iwi.

References

1896 deaths
New Zealand military personnel
Ngāti Porou people
New Zealand Māori soldiers
Year of birth missing